Cenocorixa is a genus of water boatmen in the family Corixidae. There are about 12 described species in Cenocorixa.

Species
These 12 species belong to the genus Cenocorixa:

 Cenocorixa andersoni Hungerford, 1948
 Cenocorixa bifida (Hungerford, 1926)
 Cenocorixa blaisdelli (Hungerford, 1930)
 Cenocorixa bui Ren & Zhu, 2010
 Cenocorixa crestiforma Ren & Zhu, 2010
 Cenocorixa dakotensis (Hungerford, 1928)
 Cenocorixa expleta (Uhler, 1895)
 Cenocorixa kuiterti Hungerford, 1948
 Cenocorixa montana Ren & Zhu, 2010
 Cenocorixa utahensis (Hungerford, 1925)
 Cenocorixa wileyi Hungerford, 1926
 Cenocorixa yuanjiangensis Xie & Liu, 2021

References

Further reading

 

Articles created by Qbugbot
Corixini
Heteroptera genera